The badminton tournament at the 2009 Southeast Asian Games was held from December 11 to December 17 in Gym Hall 1, National Sports Complex Vientiane of Laos. The men's and women's tournament have no age limit.

Medal tally

Medalists

Men's singles

Women's singles

Men's doubles

Women's doubles

Mixed doubles

Men's team

Quarter-final

Semi-final

Final

Women's team

Quarter-final

Semi-final

Final

References

External links
 
 SEA GAMES Federation Office (Results Book) 

2009 Southeast Asian Games events
2009 Southeast Asian Games
Southeast Asian Games
Badminton tournaments in Laos